The Mobile Legends: Bang Bang World Championship (abbreviated as M World) is the annual professional Mobile Legends: Bang Bang world esports championship tournament for the game wherein teams worldwide would be facing off each other to become the world champion for Mobile Legends: Bang Bang. The yearly tournament is presented by Moonton and has been held four times.

The most recent Mobile Legends: Bang Bang World Championship 2022, also known as M4, was held from January 1 to 15, 2023. It amassed 4 million concurrent viewers during the Blacklist International and RRQ Hoshi bout in the upper bracket, which made M4 the third most watched esports tournament of all time.

Background 
The very first World Championship was held in Kuala Lumpur in Malaysia. Over 16 teams competed from Asia, South America and Europe namely Brazil, Cambodia, Indonesia, Japan, Laos, Malaysia, Myanmar, the Philippines, Russia, Thailand, the United States and Vietnam. In the end, EVOS Legends and Rex Regum Qeon battled in the Grand Finals by a Best of 7. In the Finals, EVOS Legends would go on to win the World Championship in 7 Games and they were named as the first World Championship. With the Prize Pool at $250,000, Team EVOS Legends would go on to bring home $80,000, and the MVP winning $3,000.

The Second World Championship were set to be held in a public venue before the COVID-19 pandemic hit worldwide that had cancelled the public M2 World Championship games. However, the Second Championship were to continue as it was held on January 18 to 24, 2021. The original venue of the Second World Championship were to be in Jakarta in Indonesia but was moved to Singapore. M2 featured over 12 teams from different nations from the entire world like Brazil and Russia, but was completely dominated by Asia-based esports teams like Cambodia, Indonesia, Japan, Malaysia, Myanmar, the Philippines, and Singapore. The defending champions of EVOS Legends did not participate in the said Championship, however, their Singaporean branch qualified to compete. Among the twelve teams, the Philippines esports team Bren Esports was crowned the champion by defeating Burmese Ghouls in seven games.

The Third World Championship was held in Singapore for the second time on December 6–19, 2021

History

The M1 World Championship 
The first world championship was held in Kuala Lumpur in Malaysia wherein over 16 teams flew to Malaysia and competed for the title of World Champion in Mobile Legends: Bang Bang. M1 marked the first ever world-wide competition for Mobile Legends: Bang Bang. Through Local Qualifiers and Professional Esports Leagues, the first iteration of MLBB's world series was primarily made up of teams from Brazil, Cambodia, Indonesia, Japan, Laos, Malaysia, Myanmar, the Philippines, Russia, Singapore, Thailand, Turkey and Vietnam. The Mobile Legends: Bang Bang Professional League (MPL) sent two teams from Indonesia, Malaysia/Singapore, Myanmar and the Philippines. The tournament was held from November 10 to 17, 2019. With a prize pool of $250,000, the games began with the Group Stages wherein teams were drawn and divided before the competition into four groups, each containing 4 teams. These teams would face off each other to fight for a spot in both the upper and lower brackets of the playoffs. Two teams would advance and two teams would be eliminated from the group stages. Indonesia's two representatives, EVOS Legends and RRQ (Rex Regum Qeon), Myanmar's Burmese Ghouls, and Malaysia's TODAK, managed to qualify for the upper bracket spots, while Japan's 10s Gaming+, The Philippine's Sunsparks, Vietnam's VEC Fantasy Main, and Malaysia' other representative Axis Esports qualified for the remaining playoff spots in the lower bracket.

EVOS Legends became the first World Champions after winning against RRQ in a tight matchup that went all the way to 7 games. EVOS Legends would bring home $80,000 and an additional $3,000 for the finals MVP of the tournament, Eko “Oura” Julianto.

The M2 World Championship 

The second iteration of the world series was originally going to take place in Jakarta, Indonesia but was postponed and moved to Shangri-La Hotel in Singapore due to the COVID-19 pandemic. Then-Current Champions EVOS Legends failed to qualify for M2 after being eliminated from the playoffs of the sixth season of MPL-ID. In EVOS' absence, RRQ Hoshi and Alter Ego, the two grand finalists of the sixth season, represented Indonesia at M2, carrying on the heavy burden of defending Indonesia's throne as the best region in the world. The Second World Championship welcomed a narrowed down total of 12 teams to Singapore to compete and become the new world champions. Teams of the United States, Laos, Vietnam and Turkey did not represent their countries and teams in the second edition of the games. The prize pool for the second iteration was increased from $250,000 to $300,000. With the same format as the first World Championship, the Games were held from 18 to 24 January 2021 after its dates were moved to wait for the easing of COVID-19 pandemic the restrictions in Singapore. Among the 12 teams, the Philippines' own Bren Esports and Myanmar's Burmese Ghouls qualified to battle in the Grand Finals. After a grueling series that lasted for 7 games just like M1, Bren Esports proudly secured the championship after pulling off a massive victory in the tightly matched final game, making them the first ever Filipino team to win the MLBB world title. Later on, Moonton would also release a limited edition Bren Esports skin in honor of Bren's victory, a privilege that Moonton also handed to EVOS Legends after they won the first world Championship in 2019 as a tribute to their victory. Ultimately, Bren chose their signature jungle hero Lancelot for their honorary skin as a tribute to the finals MVP of the tournament, Karl "KarlTzy"  Gabriel Nepomuceno.

The M3 World Championship 

The third iteration of the world series began on 6 December and ended on the 19th in the year of 2021. M3 marked the second time the world series for Mobile Legends took place in Singapore. It was also held offline. Similar to its first iteration, M3 welcomed 16 teams from different regions around the world to compete and become the best team in the world. New MPL franchise teams like SeeYouSoon from MPL Cambodia, as well as RED Canids and Vivo Keyd from MPL Brazil, participated in the tournament. Moreover, non-MPL teams from the United States, Russia, Middle East, and Latin America (LATAM) also joined the bid for the world title. Unlike M2, Myanmar and Japan were not able to join the third edition of the world championship. Additionally, M3 saw the prize pool increase from $300,000 to $800,000.

After two grueling weeks of world-class action in the land of dawn, Blacklist International was hailed as the new world champions after defeating their fellow countrymen ONIC Philippines with a clean 4-0 sweep, breaking the tradition of the final match of the world championship going all the way to 7 games. Blacklist International's total shutout against Onic PH would mark the first ever sweep in the grand finals of the world stage. The M3 finals also marked the second time the world championship had representatives from the same nation become the grand finalists. Kiel "OHEB" Calvin Q. Soriano, the team's Gold Laner who was notoriously known throughout the tournament as the "Filipino Sniper", was crowned as the finals MVP. When he was asked which hero he wanted for Blacklist's honorary skin, he chose Estes, which is the team's signature pick and the very engine of their infamous "UBE" strategy. With their triumphant victory, Blacklist International became the second Filipino team to win the world title.

The M4 World Championship 

The fourth iteration of the Mobile Legends: Bang Bang world series began on 1 January and ended on the 15th of the same month in 2023. The fourth global tournament was held in Jakarta, Indonesia. Like its M1 and M3 counterpart, the tournament was played in an offline setup. It featured 16 teams from different regions around the world. MPL-franchise teams from Indonesia, Philippines, Malaysia, Singapore, Cambodia, Brazil, and MENA (Middle East and North Africa), as well as non-MPL qualifiers from the United States, Latin America, and Mekong (Myanmar, Lao PDR, Thailand, and Vietnam) will participate. This tournament saw the omission of previous participants from the Commonwealth of Independent States due to the ongoing 2022 Russia-Ukraine conflict.
 
The prize pool was similar to the M3 World Championships, amounting to 800,000 USD.

In the final match up, two Filipino teams meet once again at the grand stage to claim the M4 World Championship. Defending champions and upper bracket finalists Blacklist International battled lower bracket winners ECHO Philippines in a best-of-seven series. After a world-class performance, ECHO Philippines won the championship against the defending champion Blacklist by sweeping the latter with a 4-0 run. Benedict "Bennyqt" Gonzales won the finals MVP award.

The M5 World Championship 

As revealed in the latest MLBB Esports 2023 roadmap, the fifth iteration of the Mobile Legends: Bang Bang world series will be held in the Philippines on December 2023. The venues and exact dates of the event are currently unknown.

Viewership

Participating regions 
The number in each box represents the number of teams by region.

Participating teams

M1 World Championship (2019)

M2 World Championship (2020)

M3 World Championship (2021)

M4 World Championship (2023)

Results

Grand Final Winners 
Since M1, the World Championships are settled on a best-of-seven series featuring the upper and lower bracket winners. 
 - Denotes the Team Won the MLBB World Championships

References 

Mobile Legends: Bang Bang competitions